The Curse of the Cat People is a 1944 American psychological fantasy thriller film directed by Gunther von Fritsch and Robert Wise, produced by Val Lewton, and starring Simone Simon, Kent Smith, and Jane Randolph. Its plot follows Amy, a young girl who befriends the ghost of her father's deceased first wife, Irena, a Serbian fashion designer who descended from a race of people who could transform into cats. The film, which marks Wise's first directing credit, is a sequel to Cat People (1942) and has many of the same characters. However, it is only tangentially related to its predecessor.

Plot
Following the death of his wife, Irena Dubrovna, engineer Oliver Reed has remarried to his former co-worker, Alice. The couple now have a six-year-old daughter, Amy, and reside in Tarrytown, New York. Oliver worries about Amy's extreme introversion and predilection to fantasy, as the behavior reminds him of Irena, whose madness drove her to death. At the urging of her parents, Amy attempts to make friends with the neighborhood children, who spurn her. While walking through the neighborhood, Amy pauses in front of a large house, which the other children claim is inhabited by a witch. An elderly woman's voice beckons Amy from a second-floor window, and she follows. From the window, the woman drops a handkerchief and a ring to the ground. Amy takes it, though the hankie is promptly snatched from her by Barbara Farren, the elderly woman's rejected daughter.

The Reeds' butler, Edward, tells Amy the ring appears to be a "wishing ring" and suggests she make a wish to it. In the garden, Amy wishes simply for a friend. Moments later, a wind encircles her, and she begins frolicking with what Oliver and Edward observe as an imaginary friend. The next day, Amy goes back to the house to return the ring. She is met inside by Barbara's eccentric elderly mother, a former stage actress named Julia. Julia tells Amy that her real daughter is dead, and that Barbara is a spy posing as her. Amy looks on as Julia dramatically reenacts the legend of the Headless Horseman of Sleepy Hollow, but the story is cut short when Edward comes to retrieve Amy. After Amy leaves, Barbara chastises Julia for the way she treats her, but Julia continues to insist that Barbara is an imposter, and that her daughter died when she was six years old.

That night, Amy has a nightmare about the Headless Horseman. She is calmed, however, by the maternal presence of her friend - manifesting as a shadow - which sings a song to her. In the morning, Amy finds a photograph of Irena, whom she identifies as her mysterious new friend. Alice quickly hides the photograph. Amy wanders outside, where she is met by Irena's ghost. The two play together in the garden.

On Christmas Eve, Amy quietly slips outside during a family gathering to give Irena a gift in the garden. She subsequently visits the Farren house on Christmas Day, and gifts Julia a ring, which delights her. This enrages Barbara, whose gifts have been rejected by Julia; Barbara vows to murder Amy should she ever return to the house. A short time later, Amy finds a photograph of Oliver and Irena together, and insists that she knows her. Oliver dismisses this as one of Amy's fantasies and punishes her. As Amy sobs in her bedroom, she is visited by Irena, who tells her that she must depart, explaining that she is interfering with Amy's relationship with her father. Amy begs Irena to stay, but she disappears. Amy wanders outside, searching for Irena. Shortly after, Oliver and Alice realize Amy has left the house.

Outside, Amy becomes caught in a blizzard as she wanders through country backroads. She eventually seeks shelter at the Farren home. Julia takes her in, but attempts to hide her upstairs, fearing Barbara will harm Amy out of jealousy. A panicked Julia suffers a heart attack while climbing the stairs and dies. Barbara appears, and menacingly approaches Amy. Frightened, Amy invokes Irena, who replaces Barbara's image—as she does so, Amy embraces what she believes to be Irena. This disarms Barbara, who returns the child's embrace. Moments later, Oliver and police arrive at the house. Oliver embraces Amy, and the two return home. On the porch, Oliver agrees to accept his daughter's imaginary companions. Irena, watching them from the garden, disappears as they enter the house.

Cast

Awards

Production
The Curse of the Cat People, which began production at the RKO Gower Street studios in Hollywood on August 26, 1943 and stopped on October 4 of that year, with additional shooting in the week of November 21, marked two directorial debuts. Gunther von Fritsch had only directed short subjects to that time, so the film marked his feature debut, but when he fell behind schedule, having gotten only halfway through the screenplay in the 18 days of filming that had been allocated, the studio assigned film editor Robert Wise to take over, which earned him his first directorial credit. When it wrapped, the film, which had done some location shooting at Malibou Lake, California, was nine days behind schedule, and had cost so much that its budget was raised from $147,000 to $212,000. As was usual with Lewton's films, the tight budget demanded the re-use of sets, here from Orson Welles' The Magnificent Ambersons (1942), as had already been done with the predecessor Cat People.

Although sharing some of the same cast and characters and marketed as a sequel to 1942's Cat People, the film has little relationship to the earlier one. RKO studio executives wanted to cash in on the success of the first film, and insisted on keeping the title, despite producer Val Lewton's desire to change it to Amy and Her Friend. Lewton had incorporated elements of his own life into the film, integrating autobiographical details from his childhood, such as the party invitations that are "mailed" by putting them into a hollow tree. Lewton also grew up not far from Tarrytown, where the story is set, and was fond of ghost stories such as "The Headless Horseman" (Washington Irving's "The Legend of Sleepy Hollow") which is cited in The Curse of the Cat People.

Studio executives were disappointed when Lewton screened his final cut for them, and insisted on some additional scenes, such as the one of the boys chasing a black cat, being filmed and inserted into the picture. At the same time, some details which were crucial to the plot were lost in the re-editing necessary to accommodate the new scenes.

Production notes
 Amy's teacher mentions a book, The Inner World of Childhood, which is an actual book written by American psychologist Frances Wickes and published in 1927.  Psychology pioneer Carl Jung admired the book, and in 1931 wrote an introduction to it.
 Irena's lullaby, a musical motif in the score of both this film and Cat People, is an adaptation of the French lullaby Do, do, l'enfant do. The carol Irena sings in counterpoint with Shepherds Shake Off Your Drowsy Sleep is the traditional French Christmas carol Il Est Né, Le Divin Enfant. 
 The painting in the Reed house which is described as Irena's favorite piece of art is the portrait of Manuel Osorio Manrique de Zúñiga by Goya.

Release

Critical response
The Curse of the Cat People premiered in February 1944, and was often screened as a double bill with Cat People (1942).

James Agee, for instance, referred to the film's expression of "the poetry and danger of childhood". While Variety rated The Curse of the Cat People as "highly disappointing", The New York Times' Bosley Crowther called it "a rare departure from the ordinary run of horror films [which] emerges as an oddly touching study of the working of a sensitive child's mind".

The film's reputation has grown since its initial release. Film historian William K. Everson found the same sense of beauty at work in The Curse of the Cat People and Jean Cocteau's La Belle et la Bête. Director Joe Dante said that the film's "disturbingly Disneyesque fairy tale qualities have perplexed horror fans for decades", and the film has been utilized in college psychology courses. In 2010, The Moving Arts Film Journal ranked it the 35th greatest film of all time. On Rotten Tomatoes, The Curse of the Cat People holds an approval rating of 88% based on 34 reviews, with an average rating of 7.3/10. The website's critical consensus reads: "Foregoing the horror thrills of its predecessor in favor of childhood fantasy, Curse of the Cat People is a touching and psychologically complex family film couched in a ghost story".

Home media
The Curse of the Cat People is available as part of the Cat People double feature DVD which itself is part of the Val Lewton Horror Collection DVD box from Warner Home Video. It was also released on Blu-ray by Scream Factory in June 2018.

See also
 List of American films of 1944

References

Sources

External links

 
 
 
 
 

1944 films
1944 horror films
American supernatural horror films
American black-and-white films
American fantasy films
American psychological horror films
American Christmas horror films
American sequel films
1940s English-language films
Films about curses
Films scored by Roy Webb
Films set in New York (state)
Films shot in Los Angeles
Films about imaginary friends
Films about shapeshifting
Films directed by Robert Wise
Films produced by Val Lewton
RKO Pictures films
1940s Christmas films
1940s fantasy films
1940s psychological films
1944 directorial debut films
1940s American films